The 1985 NASCAR Winston Cup Series was the 37th season of professional stock car racing in the United States and the 14th modern-era Cup series season. The season began on Sunday, February 10 and ended on Sunday, November 17. Darrell Waltrip, driving for Junior Johnson, was crowned champion (for the third time in his career) at the end of the season. Bill Elliott, driving for Harry Melling, had won 11 races in 1985 (as well as the Winston Million), but lost the title by 101 points to three-time race winner Waltrip. This was the first season where all races were televised in some form.

This would be the last season without Dale Jarrett until 2009 and Mark Martin until 2014.

Teams and drivers

Complete schedule
There were 23 full-time teams in 1985.

Limited schedule

Schedule

Bold indicates the race was part of the Winston Million.

Races

Busch Clash

The Busch Clash was run on February 10 at Daytona International Speedway. Ricky Rudd drew for the pole.

Top Ten Results

44  – Terry Labonte
11  – Darrell Waltrip
9  – Bill Elliott
5  – Geoff Bodine
33  – Harry Gant
15  – Ricky Rudd
88  – Buddy Baker
2  – Rusty Wallace
4  – Joe Ruttman
28  – Cale Yarborough

7-Eleven Twin 125's

The 7-Eleven Twin 125's were run on February 14 at Daytona.

Race One Top Ten Results

9  – Bill Elliott
11  – Darrell Waltrip
55  – Benny Parsons
88  – Buddy Baker
15  – Ricky Rudd
1  – Dick Brooks
51  – Greg Sacks
47  – Ron Bouchard
5  – Geoff Bodine
12  – Neil Bonnett

Race Two Top Ten Results

28 – Cale Yarborough
21 – David Pearson
7 – Kyle Petty
43 – Richard Petty
33 – Harry Gant
66 – Phil Parsons
75 – Lake Speed
14 – A. J. Foyt
3 – Dale Earnhardt
95 – Sterling Marlin

Daytona 500 Consolation Race
For the final time to date, all 9 drivers that failed to qualify for the Daytona 500 were allowed to race in a 30 lap race. Rick Newsom was on the pole.

Full Results

Average speed: Caution flags: none

Daytona 500

The Daytona 500, the 27th running of the event, was held on February 17, 1985, at Daytona International Speedway, in Daytona Beach, Florida.

Top Ten Results

9 - Bill Elliott
75 - Lake Speed
11 - Darrell Waltrip -1 Lap
88 - Buddy Baker -1 Lap
15 - Ricky Rudd -1 Lap
51 - Greg Sacks -1 Lap
5 - Geoff Bodine -2 Laps
2 - Rusty Wallace -3 Laps
8 - Bobby Hillin Jr. -3 Laps
12 - Neil Bonnett -5 Laps (DNF: Engine Failure)

Miller High Life 400

The Miller High Life 400 was run on February 24 at Richmond Fairgrounds Raceway in Richmond, Virginia. Darrell Waltrip won the pole.

Top Ten Results

3 – Dale Earnhardt
5 – Geoff Bodine
11 – Darrell Waltrip
47 – Ron Bouchard
33 – Harry Gant
44 – Terry Labonte
7 – Kyle Petty
71 – Dave Marcis
27 – Tim Richmond
75 – Lake Speed

Carolina 500

The Carolina 500 was run on March 3 at North Carolina Motor Speedway in Rockingham, North Carolina. Terry Labonte won the pole.

Top Ten Results

12  – Neil Bonnett
33  – Harry Gant
44  – Terry Labonte
75  – Lake Speed
7  – Kyle Petty
4  – Joe Ruttman
28  – Cale Yarborough
43  – Richard Petty
2  – Rusty Wallace
3  – Dale Earnhardt

Coca-Cola 500

The Coca-Cola 500 was run on March 17 at Atlanta International Raceway in Atlanta, Georgia. Neil Bonnett won the pole.

Top Ten Results

9  – Bill Elliott
5  – Geoff Bodine
12  – Neil Bonnett
15  – Ricky Rudd
22  – Bobby Allison
44  – Terry Labonte
47  – Ron Bouchard
55  – Benny Parsons
3  – Dale Earnhardt
51  – Greg Sacks

Final career pole for Neil Bonnett.

Valleydale 500

The Valleydale 500 was run on April 6 at Bristol International Raceway in Bristol, Tennessee. Harry Gant won the pole.

Top Ten Results

3  – Dale Earnhardt
15  – Ricky Rudd
44  – Terry Labonte
88  – Buddy Baker
2  – Rusty Wallace
7  – Kyle Petty
75  – Lake Speed
43  – Richard Petty
8  – Bobby Hillin Jr.
90  – Ken Schrader (R)

This race was scheduled to run on Sunday, March 31, 1985, but was moved to Saturday, April 6 due to rain.

TranSouth 500

The TranSouth 500 was run on April 14 at Darlington Raceway in Darlington, South Carolina. Bill Elliott won the pole.

Top Ten Results

9  – Bill Elliott
11  – Darrell Waltrip
27  – Tim Richmond
44  – Terry Labonte
2  – Rusty Wallace
12  – Neil Bonnett
5  – Geoff Bodine
66  – Phil Parsons
75  – Lake Speed
22  – Bobby Allison

Northwestern Bank 400

The Northwestern Bank 400 was run on April 21 at North Wilkesboro Speedway in North Wilkesboro, North Carolina. Darrell Waltrip won the pole.

Top Ten Results

12  – Neil Bonnett
11  – Darrell Waltrip
22  – Bobby Allison
15  – Ricky Rudd
5  – Geoff Bodine
9  – Bill Elliott
44  – Terry Labonte
3  – Dale Earnhardt
75  – Lake Speed
33  – Harry Gant

Sovran Bank 500

The Sovran Bank 500 was run on April 28 at Martinsville Speedway in Martinsville, Virginia. Darrell Waltrip won the pole.

Top Ten Results

33  – Harry Gant
15  – Ricky Rudd
5  – Geoff Bodine
22  – Bobby Allison
12  – Neil Bonnett
44  – Terry Labonte
43  – Richard Petty
75  – Lake Speed
66  – Phil Parsons
2  – Rusty Wallace

Winston 500

The Winston 500 was run on May 5 at Alabama International Motor Speedway in Talladega, Alabama. Bill Elliott won the pole.

Top Ten Results

9  – Bill Elliott
7  – Kyle Petty
28  – Cale Yarborough
22  – Bobby Allison
15  – Ricky Rudd
88  – Buddy Baker
44  – Terry Labonte
71  – Dave Marcis
8  – Bobby Hillin Jr.
75  – Lake Speed

 Bill Elliott made up two laps under green during this race.  Elliott lost the laps from having to pit due to a broken oil fitting. With the victory, Elliott claimed the second leg of the Winston Million.

Budweiser 500

The Budweiser 500 was run on May 19 at Dover Downs International Speedway in Dover, Delaware. Terry Labonte won the pole.

Top Ten Results

9  – Bill Elliott
33  – Harry Gant
7  – Kyle Petty
15  – Ricky Rudd
11  – Darrell Waltrip
27  – Tim Richmond
43  – Richard Petty
75  – Neil Bonnett
71  – Dave Marcis
90  – Ken Schrader (R)

The Winston

The inaugural Winston was run on May 25 at Charlotte Motor Speedway in Concord, North Carolina. Terry Labonte won the pole due to being the defending NASCAR Winston Cup Champion.

Top Six Results

11 - Darrell Waltrip
33 - Harry Gant
44 - Terry Labonte
28 - Cale Yarborough
27 - Tim Richmond
22 - Bobby Allison

Coca-Cola World 600
The Coca-Cola World 600 was run on May 26 at Charlotte. Bill Elliott won the pole.

Top Ten Results

11  – Darrell Waltrip
33  – Harry Gant
22  – Bobby Allison
3  – Dale Earnhardt
44  – Terry Labonte
75  – Lake Speed
4  – Joe Ruttman
2  – Rusty Wallace
27  – Tim Richmond
1  – Dick Brooks

 Bill Elliott had a chance to clinch the first Winston Million, and a then NASCAR record crowd of 155,000 spectators arrived to cheer him on. After considerable pre-race hype, Elliott led 81 laps, but fell short, however, as mechanical problems plagued much of his day. Elliott would have another chance at Darlington in the Southern 500.
 Darrell Waltrip gambled on fuel, stretching his tank over the final 110 laps to secure the victory. Waltrip (who won The Winston a day earlier) nearly missed the race after a car/engine swap controversy with NASCAR Director of Competition Dick Beatty.
 This was the first NASCAR Winston Cup start for Michael Waltrip. He would finish 28th due to a transmission failure.
 Final start for 10th-place finisher Dick Brooks.

Budweiser 400

The Budweiser 400 was run on June 2 at Riverside International Raceway in Riverside, California. Darrell Waltrip won the pole.

Top Ten Results

44  – Terry Labonte
33  – Harry Gant
22  – Bobby Allison
15  – Ricky Rudd
7  – Kyle Petty
9  – Bill Elliott
43  – Richard Petty
11  – Darrell Waltrip
27  – Tim Richmond
90  – Ken Schrader (R)

Van Scoy Diamond Mine 500

The Van Scoy Diamond Mine 500 was run on June 9 at Pocono Raceway in Long Pond, Pennsylvania. Bill Elliott won the pole.

Top Ten Results

9  – Bill Elliott
33  – Harry Gant
11  – Darrell Waltrip
5  – Geoff Bodine
12  – Neil Bonnett
55  – Benny Parsons
15  – Ricky Rudd
88  – Buddy Baker
22  – Bobby Allison
27  – Tim Richmond

Miller 400

The Miller 400 was run on June 16 at Michigan International Speedway in Brooklyn, Michigan. Bill Elliott won the pole.

Top Ten Results

9  – Bill Elliott
11  – Darrell Waltrip
28  – Cale Yarborough
27  – Tim Richmond
3  – Dale Earnhardt
22  – Bobby Allison
15  – Ricky Rudd
12  – Neil Bonnett
71  – Dave Marcis
55  – Benny Parsons

Pepsi Firecracker 400

The Pepsi Firecracker 400 was run on July 4 at Daytona International Speedway in Daytona Beach, Florida. Bill Elliott won the pole.

Top Ten Results

10  – Greg Sacks
9  – Bill Elliott
11  – Darrell Waltrip
47  – Ron Bouchard
7  – Kyle Petty
88  – Buddy Baker
15  – Ricky Rudd
44  – Terry Labonte
3  – Dale Earnhardt
21  – David Pearson

 The race was won by Greg Sacks, who was driving as a Research & Development driver for DiGard Motorsports. His win caused Bobby Allison to leave the team.

 This would be Sacks’ lone career win in Winston Cup competition.

Summer 500

The Summer 500 was run on July 21 at Pocono Raceway in Long Pond, Pennsylvania. Darrell Waltrip won the pole.

Top Ten Results

9  – Bill Elliott
12  – Neil Bonnett
11  – Darrell Waltrip
5  – Geoff Bodine
33  – Harry Gant
55  – Benny Parsons
7  – Kyle Petty
66  – Phil Parsons
47  – Ron Bouchard
88  – Buddy Baker

 Bill Elliott completes his 1st of 4 track sweeps of 1985.

Talladega 500

The Talladega 500 was run on July 28 at Alabama International Motor Speedway in Talladega, Alabama. Bill Elliott won the pole.

Top Ten Results

28  Cale Yarborough
12   – Neil Bonnett
47   – Ron Bouchard
9   – Bill Elliott
14   – A. J. Foyt
43   – Richard Petty
33   – Harry Gant
75   – Lake Speed
11   – Darrell Waltrip
1   – Davey Allison*
This race was Davey Allison's Winston Cup debut.

Champion Spark Plug 400

The Champion Spark Plug 400 was run on August 11 at Michigan International Speedway in Brooklyn, Michigan. Bill Elliott won the pole.

Top Ten Results

9  – Bill Elliott
11  – Darrell Waltrip
33  – Harry Gant
7  – Kyle Petty
55  – Benny Parsons
66  – Phil Parsons
2  – Rusty Wallace
10  – Dick Trickle
44  – Terry Labonte
67  – Buddy Arrington

 Bill Elliott completes his 2nd of 4 track sweeps of 1985.

Busch 500

The Busch 500 was run on August 24 at Bristol International Raceway in Bristol, Tennessee. Dale Earnhardt won the pole.

Top Ten Results

3  – Dale Earnhardt
27  – Tim Richmond
12  – Neil Bonnett
11  – Darrell Waltrip
9  – Bill Elliott
33  – Harry Gant
47  – Ron Bouchard
43  – Richard Petty
15  – Ricky Rudd
75  – Lake Speed

Southern 500

The Southern 500 was run on September 1 at Darlington Raceway in Darlington, South Carolina. Bill Elliott won the pole.

Top Ten Results

9 – Bill Elliott
28 – Cale Yarborough
5 – Geoff Bodine
12 – Neil Bonnett -1 Lap
47 – Ron Bouchard -1 Lap
15 – Ricky Rudd -1 Lap
44 – Terry Labonte -2 Laps
55 – Benny Parsons -2 Laps
4 – Joe Ruttman -3 Laps
7 – Kyle Petty -3 Laps

 Bill Elliott won the Winston Million with the race victory.
 With this victory Elliott had a 206-point lead in the standings with 8 races left in the season.
 Elliott also completes the Darlington sweep for his 3rd of 4 track sweeps of 1985.

Wrangler Sanfor-Set 400

The Wrangler Sanfor-Set 400 was run on September 8 at Richmond Fairgrounds Raceway in Richmond, Virginia. Geoff Bodine won the pole.

Top Ten Results

11  – Darrell Waltrip
44  – Terry Labonte
43  – Richard Petty
3  – Dale Earnhardt
15  – Ricky Rudd
33  – Harry Gant
5  – Geoff Bodine
7  – Kyle Petty
12  – Neil Bonnett
18  – Tommy Ellis

 This race marked the Winston Cup Series debut of Alan Kulwicki, driving Bill Terry's #32 Ford. Kulwicki would finish 19th, 8 laps down.
 By Elliott finishing 12th in this race, Darrell Waltrip gained 53 points on Elliott.

Delaware 500

The Delaware 500 was run on September 15 at Dover Downs International Speedway in Dover, Delaware. Bill Elliott won the pole.

Top Ten Results

33  – Harry Gant
11  – Darrell Waltrip
15  – Ricky Rudd
22  – Bobby Allison
12  – Neil Bonnett
27  – Tim Richmond
3  – Dale Earnhardt
47  – Ron Bouchard
43  – Richard Petty
75  – Lake Speed

 Elliott had a disastrous race finishing in 20th place 70 laps down. Waltrip gained 67 points, Elliott now only led by 86 points.

Goody's 500

The Goody's 500 was run on September 22 at Martinsville Speedway in Martinsville, Virginia. Geoff Bodine won the pole.

Top Ten Results

3  – Dale Earnhardt
11  – Darrell Waltrip
33  – Harry Gant
15  – Ricky Rudd
7  – Kyle Petty
47  – Ron Bouchard
27  – Tim Richmond
8  – Bobby Hillin Jr.
12  – Neil Bonnett
22  – Bobby Allison

 Elliott had another disastrous race finishing in 17th place 33 laps down. Waltrip continued to chip away at Elliotts lead gaining 63 points, Elliott now only led by 23 points.

Holly Farms 400

The Holly Farms 400 was run on September 29 at North Wilkesboro Speedway in North Wilkesboro, North Carolina. Geoff Bodine won the pole.

Top Ten Results

33 – Harry Gant
5 – Geoff Bodine
44 – Terry Labonte
3 – Dale Earnhardt
15 – Ricky Rudd
47 – Ron Bouchard
27 – Tim Richmond
43 – Richard Petty
71 – Dave Marcis
12 – Neil Bonnett

 By virtue of Elliott being the second car out of the race finishing in 30th place (out of 31 starters) and Waltrip managing to finish in 14th even with car issues 7 laps down, Waltrip overtook Elliott in the standings and now led by 30 points.

Miller High Life 500

The Miller High Life 500 was run on October 6 at Charlotte Motor Speedway in Concord, North Carolina. Harry Gant won the pole.

Top Ten Results

28 – Cale Yarborough
9 – Bill Elliott
5 – Geoff Bodine
11 – Darrell Waltrip
4 – Joe Ruttman
27 – Tim Richmond
16 – Morgan Shepherd
88 – Buddy Baker
8 – Bobby Hillin Jr.
43 – Richard Petty

 Cale Yarborough's win would be his 83rd and the final one of his career before retiring after 1988.
 Elliott and Waltrip both led laps and by Elliott finishing in 2nd he sliced 10 points off Waltrips lead with just 20 points separating the two with three races remaining.

Nationwise 500

The Nationwise 500 was run on October 20 at a freshly repaved North Carolina Motor Speedway in Rockingham, North Carolina. Terry Labonte won the pole.

Top Ten Results

11  – Darrell Waltrip
47  – Ron Bouchard
33  – Harry Gant
9  – Bill Elliott
5  – Geoff Bodine
27  – Tim Richmond
15  – Ricky Rudd
3  – Dale Earnhardt
2  – Rusty Wallace
77  – Greg Sacks

 Elliott finishing three spots down in 4th lost ground to Waltrip by 15 points due to Waltrip winning. Waltrip now led by 35 points, with just Atlanta and Riverside left to settle the Championship.

Atlanta Journal 500

The Atlanta Journal 500 was run on November 3 at Atlanta International Raceway in Hampton, Georgia. Harry Gant won the pole.

Top Ten Results

9 – Bill Elliott
28 – Cale Yarborough
11 – Darrell Waltrip
3 – Dale Earnhardt
16 – Morgan Shepherd
44 – Terry Labonte
75 – Lake Speed
33 – Harry Gant
77 – Greg Sacks
43 – Richard Petty
11th and final win of the season for Bill Elliott.
With this win, and as of 2022, Bill Elliott is the only driver in NASCAR history to pull off the season sweep at 4 different tracks in one season. Along with the season sweep at Atlanta, he swept Pocono, Michigan, and Darlington. In 2004 however, Jimmie Johnson pulled off the season sweep at 3 different tracks, coming close to tying Bill Elliott's record. The tracks Johnson pulled off the season sweep are Pocono, Charlotte, and Darlington.
With Elliott getting the bonus points for leading the most laps, Waltrip lost 15 points on his lead. Elliott now had a 20-point deficit going into the season finale at Riverside where he picked up his first Cup victory in 1983, while Waltrip had five wins at the road course. If Elliott won at Riverside then all Waltrip would have to do to win the title would be to finish no lower than seventh if he did not lead a lap. If DW led a lap then he could finish no lower than eighth to win the title. If he led the most laps then he could finish no lower than ninth.
Morgan Shepherd scored his only top five finish of 1985 driving for David Pearson's team.
Sprint car ace Sammy Swindell starts his first of two career Cup races. He finished 30th after a crash, he completed 242 of 328 laps.

Winston Western 500

The Winston Western 500 was run on November 17 at Riverside International Raceway in Riverside, California. Terry Labonte won the pole.

Top Ten Results

15  – Ricky Rudd
44  – Terry Labonte
75  – Neil Bonnett
33  – Harry Gant
3  – Dale Earnhardt
5  – Geoff Bodine
11  – Darrell Waltrip
43  – Richard Petty
75  – Lake Speed
47  – Ron Bouchard

After winning the previous race, which was at Atlanta, Bill Elliott came into this race 2nd in points, only 20 points behind Darrell Waltrip, giving him a shot to rebound for the championship after a string of poor finishes in 4 of the last 5 races. During this race however, Elliott would suffer early transmission problems, and it would unfortunately cost him the championship. He finished the race in 31st. Waltrip clinched the title once he completed 99 laps of the race, he then finished in 7th, gaining 81 points on Elliott. Darrell Waltrip won his 3rd and final Winston Cup title, having won only three races to Bill Elliott's eleven. Elliott would officially lose the championship by 101 points. This would be the 1st time in Bob Latford's Winston Cup points system that a driver winning 10 or more races in a season failed to win the championship due to poor finishes and lack of consistency in the final stretch of the season.
This was the final race for Richard Petty driving for Mike Curb. Richard would take his number 43 with STP sponsorship home to Petty Enterprises for 1986.
This was the final race for Rusty Wallace driving for Cliff Stewart Racing. Rusty's season of misery concluded with a 36th-place finish due to engine failure completing 70 of 119 laps. This was Rusty's 12th DNF of the season, 10 of them were due to engine failures.

Full Drivers' Championship

(key) Bold – Pole position awarded by time. Italics – Pole position set by owner's points. * – Most laps led.

Rookie of the year
Ken Schrader won the 1985 NASCAR Winston Cup Series rookie of the year. He beat out both Eddie Bierschwale (who failed to qualify for the Daytona 500 and skipped the next race) and Don Hume (who only competed in 7 races) for the honors.

See also
1985 NASCAR Busch Series

References

External links 
 Winston Cup Standings and Statistics for 1985

 

NASCAR Cup Series seasons